Kridener is a surname. Notable people with the surname include: 

Nikolay Kridener (1811-1891), Baltic German infantry general
Pavel Kridener (1784-1858), Russian diplomat